Jahangiri, Iran is a village in Andimeshk County, Khuzestan Province, Iran.

Jahangiri, in Iran, may also refer to:
 Jahangiri-ye Olya, a village in Shadegan County, Khuzestan Province, Iran
 Jahangiri-ye Sofla, a village in Shadegan County, Khuzestan Province, Iran
 Jahangiri Rural District, in Masjed Soleyman County, Khuzestan Province, Iran